Lawrence Sherry (July 25, 1935 – December 17, 2006) was an American professional baseball player and coach. He played in Major League Baseball as a right-handed relief pitcher from 1958 to 1968, most prominently as a member of the Los Angeles Dodgers and Detroit Tigers. He was named the Most Valuable Player of the 1959 World Series as the Dodgers won their first championship since relocating from Brooklyn just two years earlier. After his playing career, Sherry managed in the minor leagues before serving as a major league coach for the Pittsburgh Pirates and the California Angels.

Early life
Sherry was born in Los Angeles, California, and was Jewish.  He was born with clubfeet, for which he needed surgery as an infant and wore special shoes.  He attended Fairfax High School in Los Angeles.  His brother Norm Sherry also played in Major League Baseball (MLB).

Baseball career
From Los Angeles, Sherry made his debut with his hometown Dodgers on April 17,  – just their third game after moving west.  Adding to the pressure, the game was played on the road against their hated rivals, the San Francisco Giants, who had also relocated from New York City.  Sherry had a brief outing, facing four batters without recording an out, and appeared in only four more games all year.

He was named MVP of the 1959 World Series, in which the Dodgers defeated the Chicago White Sox in 6 games, and also received the Babe Ruth Award. Sherry completed all four Dodger victories during the Series, winning two of them and saving the two others, and had a 0.71 ERA in  innings.

In  he won a career-high 14 games, finished 38 games (4th in the league), pitched in 57 games (6th in the league), and even received support for MVP, coming in 20th in the voting.

In 1961 he was 5th in the NL in saves (15) and games finished (34), and 9th in games pitched (53). In 1962 he was 7th in saves (11) and games pitched (58).

He was traded to the Tigers for Lou Johnson and cash just before the  season, and spent three and a half years with his new club, earning a career-best 20 saves in 1966, 3rd-best in the AL.

Sherry retired with a record of 53–44, 606 strikeouts, 82 saves and a 3.67 ERA in 416 games and  innings.

Through 2010, he was 5th all-time in career games (directly behind Dave Roberts), 8th in strikeouts (directly behind Barney Pelty), and 9th in wins (directly behind Barry Latman) among Jewish major league baseball players.

Coaching career
After his pitching career, Sherry managed in the farm systems of the White Sox (1970–1972) and Pittsburgh Pirates and coached in the Dodgers' minor league organization.  He was the Pirates' MLB pitching coach in 1977 and 1978, then held the same post with the California Angels in 1979 and 1980.

Accolades
In a 1976 Esquire magazine article, sportswriter Harry Stein published an "All Time All-Star Argument Starter," consisting of five ethnic baseball teams. Sherry was the relief pitcher on Stein's Jewish team.  [Esquire, Vol. 86 (July, 1976), 74–75, 115.]

In 1993 Sherry was inducted into the Southern California Jewish Sports Hall of Fame.

Death
On December 17, 2006, Sherry died at his home in Mission Viejo, California, after a long battle with cancer.

See also
List of select Jewish baseball players

References

External links

SABR biography
Larry Sherry - Baseballbiography.com
MLB Obituary
Obituary, December 20, 2006, The New York Times

1935 births
2006 deaths
Asheville Tourists managers
Bakersfield Indians players
Baseball players from Los Angeles
California Angels coaches
California Angels players
Deaths from cancer in California
Detroit Tigers players
Fairfax High School (Los Angeles) alumni
Fort Worth Cats players
Great Falls Electrics players
Hawaii Islanders players
Houston Astros players
Jewish American baseball coaches
Jewish American baseball managers
Jewish American baseball players
Jewish Major League Baseball players
Los Angeles Dodgers players
Los Angeles Angels (minor league) players
Major League Baseball pitchers
Major League Baseball pitching coaches
Mobile White Sox players
Newport News Dodgers players
Pittsburgh Pirates coaches
Pueblo Dodgers players
Santa Barbara Dodgers players
Seattle Angels players
Spokane Indians players
Sportspeople from Mission Viejo, California
Sportspeople from Orange County, California
St. Paul Saints (AA) players
Tucson Toros players
World Series Most Valuable Player Award winners
20th-century American Jews
21st-century American Jews